24 Nights is the fifth live album by Eric Clapton, compiled from 42 concerts performed at the Royal Albert Hall in London, England, in 1990 and 1991. It was released on 8 October 1991.  The cover illustration is by Peter Blake.

Background
Following a record-setting run of 12 concerts at the Royal Albert Hall in 1989, Clapton broke his own record in 1990, by playing 18 nights at the venue between 18 January and 10 February 1990.

These concerts were performed with four different ensembles.  The first six nights featured a 4-piece band, with Clapton, bassist Nathan East, drummer Steve Ferrone and keyboardist Greg Phillinganes. The second six nights featured a 9-piece band, with the four-piece band joined by Phil Palmer on guitar, Alan Clark on keyboards, Ray Cooper on percussion, and backing vocalists Katie Kissoon and Tessa Niles. Then came three nights with a blues band, featuring Johnnie Johnson on keyboards, Robert Cousins on bass, and Jamie Oldaker on drums, plus special guests Buddy Guy and Robert Cray. And finally three orchestra nights, with the 9-piece band joined by the National Philharmonic Orchestra conducted by Michael Kamen.

The following year, Clapton played the titular "24 Nights", between 5 February and 9 March 1991. This run had a similar configuration as the previous year, with four different ensembles, this time for 6 nights each. The only change in the four-piece, nine-piece, and orchestral groups was the substitution of Chuck Leavell for Alan Clark. The blues band was reshuffled, with Joey Spampinato replacing Robert Cousins on bass, and adding Jimmie Vaughan as a regular guitarist, Chuck Leavell on keyboard, and Jerry Portnoy on harmonica; Guy and Cray were joined by an additional guest performer, Albert Collins.

Recording
Five of the 1990 concerts were recorded for the live album -- the final night with the first three ensembles, and the final two nights with the orchestra.

The 4-piece band recording on 24 January 1990 produced the versions of "Running on Faith", "White Room" and "Sunshine of Your Love" that were included on the CD and DVD. "Worried Life Blues", "Watch Yourself" and "Have You Ever Loved a Woman" were from the blues band recording on 5 February 1990.  "Bell Bottom Blues" and "Hard Times" with the orchestra were taken from the first of those sessions, on 9 February 1990. No songs were used from the 9-piece band recording on 1 February 1990, or the second orchestral recording on 10 February 1990.

Clapton reportedly was not satisfied with these recordings, and delayed the release of a CD until the following year.  Another five concerts were recorded in 1991, this time the penultimate night with the first three ensembles, and the two orchestra nights before the final night.

"Badge" was taken from the 4-piece show on 10 February 1991.  The 9-piece band session on 18 February 1991 produced "Pretending", "Bad Love", "Old Love" and "Wonderful Tonight" for this album, plus recordings of "No Alibis", "I Shot The Sheriff" and "Cocaine" which were subsequently released on various CD singles of "Wonderful Tonight". "Hoodoo Man" was from the blues band night recorded on 28 February 1991.  "Edge of Darkness" was from the first orchestral session on 7 March 1991. No songs were used from the second orchestral recording on 8 March 1991.

The versions of "Old Love", "Wonderful Tonight" and "Pretending" (2nd solo only) on the "24 Nights" DVD are different from their album counterparts.  They were not taken from the previous night's show. They can be identified as 1991 by the appearance of Chuck Leavell, who was not with the band in 1990.

Track listing (CD)

Disc one 
 "Badge" (Eric Clapton/George Harrison) – 6:51
 "Running on Faith" (Jerry Lynn Williams) – 6:49
 "White Room" (Jack Bruce/Pete Brown) – 6:10
 "Sunshine of Your Love" (Bruce/Brown/Clapton) – 9:11
 "Watch Yourself" (Buddy Guy) – 5:39
 "Have You Ever Loved a Woman" (Billy Myles) – 6:52
 "Worried Life Blues" (Big Maceo Merriweather) – 5:28
 "Hoodoo Man" (Amos "Junior" Wells) – 5:41

Disc two 
 "Pretending" (Jerry Lynn Williams) – 7:08
 "Bad Love" (Clapton/Mick Jones) – 6:25
 "Old Love" (Clapton/Robert Cray) – 13:01
 "Wonderful Tonight" (Clapton) – 9:11
 "Bell Bottom Blues" (Clapton/Bobby Whitlock) – 6:39
 "Hard Times" (Ray Charles) – 3:45
 "Edge of Darkness" (Clapton/Michael Kamen) – 6:30

Track listing (DVD) 

 "Running on Faith" (6:49)
 "White Room" (6:10)
 "Sunshine of Your Love" (9:11)
 "Watch Yourself" (5:39)
 "Have You Ever Loved A Woman" (6:52)
 "Worried Life Blues" (5:28)
 "Pretending" (7:08)
 "Bad Love" (6:25)
 "Old Love" (13:01)
 "Wonderful Tonight" (9:11)
 "Bell Bottom Blues" (6:39)
 "Hard Times" (3:45)
 "Edge of Darkness" (6:30)

Charts

Weekly charts

Certifications

Album

Video

References

External links 
 Eric Clapton Bootography 

Albums produced by Russ Titelman
Eric Clapton live albums
Live albums recorded at the Royal Albert Hall
1991 live albums
Reprise Records live albums
Eric Clapton video albums